Smittia is a genus of European non-biting midges in the subfamily Orthocladiinae of the bloodworm family (Chironomidae).

Species
S. albipennis (Goetghebuer, 1921)
S. amoena Caspers, 1985
S. aterrima (Meigen, 1818)
S. brevifurcata (Edwards, 1926)
S. contingens (Walker, 1856)
S. edwardsi Goetghebuer, 1932
S. extrema (Holmgren, 1869)
S. foliacea (Kieffer, 1921)
S. hakusansecunda Sasa & Okazawa, 1994
S. leucopogon (Meigen, 1804)
S. nudipennis (Goetghebuer, 1913)
S. pratorum (Goetghebuer, 1927)
S. superata Goetghebuer, 1939

References

Chironomidae
Diptera of Europe
Taxa named by August Holmgren